Aygedzor is a village in the Berd Municipality of the Tavush Province of Armenia. The Aghjkaberd mountain fortress is located close to Aygedzor.

Toponymy 
The village was previously known as Kulali.

Gallery

References

External links 

World Gazeteer: Armenia – World-Gazetteer.com

Populated places in Tavush Province